Gosné (Gallo: Gosnae) is a commune in the Ille-et-Vilaine department in Brittany in northwestern France.

International relations
It is twinned with Ballyheigue in County Kerry, Ireland.

Population

Inhabitants of Gosné are called Gosnéens in French.

Geography

The bordering communes are Saint-Aubin-du-Cormier, Liffré, and Ercé-près-Liffré.

See also
Communes of the Ille-et-Vilaine department

References

External links

 Geography of Brittany 
 The page of the commune on infobretagne.com 

Communes of Ille-et-Vilaine